Sadie Sinclair (also King) is a fictional character from the British television soap opera Emmerdale, played by Patsy Kensit. She made her first appearance during the episode broadcast on 10 May 2004. The character was introduced as the ex-wife of Jimmy King (Nick Miles), who arrived with his family in 2004. Kensit left the serial to accept a role on Holby City and Sadie made her final appearance on 21 September 2006. Kensit won the Best Bitch accolade for her portrayal of Sadie at the 2005 and 2006 Inside Soap Awards.

Storylines
Sadie arrives in Emmerdale via helicopter to join her husband Jimmy King (Nick Miles). Sadie begins to lose interest in Jimmy when she realises they both have vastly different dreams, with Sadie being ambitious and Jimmy wanting a family. Sadie begins taking contraceptive injections behind Jimmy's back and when she confesses, Jimmy demands a divorce. Sick of being rejected by Jimmy, Sadie begins an affair with local mechanic Robert Sugden (Karl Davies). Knowing that Jimmy's rejection means her position in the King family is under threat, Sadie hatches a plan to ensure that Charity Dingle (Emma Atkins) never becomes Tom King's (Kenneth Farrington) wife. She employs a private detective to trail Charity and bribes her relative and lover Cain Dingle (Jeff Hordley) to get Charity in a compromising position. Sadie then presents Tom with the incriminating photos on the day of the wedding, which does not go ahead. Charity retaliates by having sex with Jimmy and videotaping the event. When Charity arrives at Jimmy's birthday party several weeks later, she tells the Kings that she and Jimmy have been having an affair, before playing the tape in which Jimmy reveals Sadie's scheming and the state of their marriage. In the fallout, Tom disowns Jimmy and Sadie. Sadie enlists Cain's help again and is able to buy the land the Kings want for their development and blackmails her way back into the company.

Sadie has sex with Cain, but later rejects his advances. Cain takes his revenge on Sadie by killing her dog. When Jimmy and Carl's youngest brother Max King (Charlie Kemp) dies in a road collision, Sadie uses Tom's vulnerability to her advantage and blackmails his business rival Zoe Tate (Leah Bracknell) into selling Home Farm to the Kings. This impresses Tom as he sought to own Home Farm to further establish his family empire. Sadie begins a relationship with her eldest brother-in-law, Matthew King (Matt Healy). As Tom prepares to step down from running the company and hand the reins to Matthew, Jimmy exposes the affair and Tom gives Matthew an ultimatum – the company or Sadie. Matthew chooses the business, devastating Sadie. Sadie rebounds by becoming engaged to wealthy Alasdair Sinclair (Ray Coulthard). After Sadie and Alasdair get married, within minutes, Matthew confesses his love for Sadie and she chooses him, much to the anger of Alasdair who punches Matthew. Sadie encourages Matthew to buy Don Clough's haulage business and give his family false information.

Sadie pays Cain to sabotage the opening of the Kings' River's Show home development. Jimmy confronts her, but she knocks him out. The show home explodes, killing Dawn Woods (Julia Mallam), Noreen Bell (Jenny Tomasin) and estate agent David Brown (Peter Alexander). Jimmy survives and tells Matthew what Sadie did and when Matthew confronts her, she confesses to staging the explosion. Out for revenge, Sadie and Cain devise a plot to kidnap Tom. Cain shoots Sadie, seemingly killing her, but it is later to be revealed to have been staged. Sadie then leaves the village. She later sends flowers to Tom's funeral several months later, however, the flowers are discarded by Matthew.

Casting
In February 2004 it was announced that Pasty Kensit had agreed to sign a contract to play a new character in Emmerdale who will appear from May onwards. Speaking of her casting Kensit said: "I'm a bit of a country girl at heart, and it's so exciting to be joining a popular soap." A show spokeswomen said: "She is a seductive, powerful and manipulative woman who knows what she wants and makes sure she gets it. We hope her character will follow in the footsteps of the soap's last super bitch, Kim Tate (Claire King)." Also saying Pasty said: "I can’t wait to get started on Emmerdale and I’ve become an avid viewer! I am a bit of a country girl at heart and it is so exciting to be joining, especially at a time when the show is so strong. The prospect of being watched by over 10 million viewers every night is intimidating but I can’t wait to get stuck in." Series Producer, Steve Frost says, "We’re very excited to have Patsy on board and looking forward to introducing such a great character to the show. Sadie will be the envy of women and the desire of men."

In December 2005, it was reported that Kensit had decided to leave the role of Sadie for an opportunity to star in the BBC medical drama Holby City as nurse Faye Morton.

Reception
Kensit's portrayal of Sadie earned her the "Best Bitch" award at the 2005 and 2006 Inside Soap Award ceremonies, respectively. She was also nominated for "Sexiest Female" at the 2006 British Soap Awards.
Sadie's and Cain's exit was nominated for "Best Single episode" the 2007 British Soap Awards.

The scenes during the episode featuring Sadie and Cain's exit where they kidnap Tom King and Cain appears to shoot Sadie received 37 complaints to media regulator Ofcom. ITV defended the storyline by saying it was one of the most "exciting and successful" events in the serial's history and added "Whilst Emmerdale stories do not condone violent acts, it need not and should not shy away from them." 8.5 million viewers tuned in for the episode.

References

Emmerdale characters
Television characters introduced in 2004
Fictional female businesspeople
Fictional blackmailers
Fictional criminals in soap operas
Female villains
Female characters in television